Full Bloom may refer to:

 Full Bloom (Kara album), a 2013 album by KARA
 Full Bloom (Acoustic Strawbs album), a 2004 album by Acoustic Strawbs
 Full Bloom (Soft Circle album), a 2007 album by Soft Circle
 Full Bloom, a 1977 album by Carol Douglas
 Rose Royce II: In Full Bloom, a 1977 album by Rose Royce
 Full Bloom (TV series), a realty television series that premiered in November 2020
 Full Bloom, a Facebook game published by Playdom

See also
 Full-On Bloom, a 1993 album by American band Gigolo Aunts
 In Full Bloom, a 1977 album by American band Rose Royce